HLY may refer to:
 Healthy Life Years
 Holytown railway station, in Scotland
 Hong Leong Yamaha, a Malaysian motorcycle distributor
 hly, a gene encoding Listeriolysin O